Cornel Flaviu Cornea (born 28 July 1981) is a Romanian former professional football player. His first match in Liga I was against FCM Bacău, when he was playing at Gloria Bistriţa. Cornea started his career in his hometown, Beclean, at Laminorul and throughout his career he played for several teams in the top three leagues of Romanian football such as: Baia Mare, Oțelul Galați, Gloria Bistriţa, FC Vaslui, Botoşani, Astra Ploieşti and Unirea Alba Iulia among others. He also played 4 matches for the Moldovan side Zimbru Chișinău and from 2014 he moved to England where he played for F.C. Romania and Wingate & Finchley.

References

External links
 
 

1981 births
Living people
People from Beclean
Romanian footballers
Association football defenders
Association football midfielders
Liga I players
ASC Oțelul Galați players
ACF Gloria Bistrița players
FC Vaslui players
FC Astra Giurgiu players
Liga II players
CS Minaur Baia Mare (football) players
FC Botoșani players
FC Delta Dobrogea Tulcea players
FC Politehnica Iași (2010) players
CSM Unirea Alba Iulia players
ACS Foresta Suceava players
CS Știința Miroslava players
Super League Greece players
OFI Crete F.C. players
Moldovan Super Liga players
FC Zimbru Chișinău players
F.C. Romania players
Wingate & Finchley F.C. players
Romanian expatriate footballers
Romanian expatriate sportspeople in Greece
Expatriate footballers in Greece
Romanian expatriate sportspeople in Moldova
Expatriate footballers in Moldova
FC Unirea Dej players